is a Japanese politician of the Liberal Democratic Party, a member of the House of Representatives in the Diet (national legislature), representing the 4th District of Aichi Prefecture. A native of Tokyo and graduate of the University of the Sacred Heart, she was elected to the House of Representatives for the first time in 2005. Her husband is Kimitaka Fujino, a member of the House of Councilors in the Diet.

See also 
 Koizumi Children

References

External links 
  in Japanese.

Members of the House of Representatives (Japan)
Female members of the House of Representatives (Japan)
Koizumi Children
Spouses of Japanese politicians
Politicians from Tokyo
Living people
1949 births
Liberal Democratic Party (Japan) politicians
21st-century Japanese women politicians
University of the Sacred Heart (Japan) alumni